WNGT-CD, virtual channel 34 (UHF digital channel 23), is a low-power, Class A Decades-affiliated television station licensed to both Smithfield and Selma, North Carolina, United States and serving the Triangle region (Raleigh–Durham–Chapel Hill–Fayetteville). Locally owned by Capitol Broadcasting Company, it is a sister station to Capitol's duopoly of NBC affiliate and company flagship WRAL-TV (channel 5) and Fox affiliate WRAZ (channel 50), both licensed to Raleigh. The stations share studios at Capitol Broadcasting headquarters on Western Boulevard in Raleigh, while WNGT-CD's transmitter is located atop WRAL-TV's former analog tower, on TV Tower Road in Auburn, North Carolina. Prior to 2021, the station transmitted from South Pollock Street (US 301) in Selma, near the Selma Memorial Cemetery.

On September 11, 2020, Waters & Brock Communications reached a deal to sell then-WARZ-CD to Capitol Broadcasting for use as an ATSC 3.0 NextGen TV multiplex for its Raleigh television stations.

While WNGT-CD's signal is used to multiplex ATSC 3.0 transmissions, its original programming is now aired via a subchannel of WRAL-TV that displays as virtual channel 34.1.

On October 21, 2021, the station's call letters were changed to WNGT-CD.

Technical information

Subchannel

ATSC 3.0 lighthouse
WNGT-CD's ATSC 3.0 multiplex carries its main programming and those of its sister Capitol stations and PBS member station WUNC-TV.

On November 20, 2020, then-WARZ-CD switched over to ATSC 3.0, with simulcasts from WRAL-TV and WRAZ. On December 10, WRAL-TV began the ATSC 1.0 simulcast of WARZ-CD. On March 22, PBS North Carolina began simulcast of WUNC-TV.

References

NGT-CD
Television channels and stations established in 1991
1991 establishments in North Carolina
Low-power television stations in the United States
Capitol Broadcasting Company
ATSC 3.0 television stations